Michael Harwood may refer to:

Michael Harwood (author) (1934–1989), American nature writer
Michael Harwood (musician) (born 1973), former guitarist for the band Ultra
Michael Harwood (RAF officer) (born 1958)
Mike Harwood (born 1959), Australian golfer